Floyd John Chiffer (born April 20, 1956) is a former Major League Baseball pitcher who attended the University of California, Los Angeles. He played his entire career for the San Diego Padres, with his best year coming in 1982 when he appeared in 51 games, with a 2.95 ERA. On December 7, 1984, Chiffer was traded to the Minnesota Twins but never pitched in another major league game.

Chiffer is noteworthy for having been drafted three times in the Major League Baseball Draft in three years, by three teams, finally signing with the San Diego Padres after the 1978 draft.

External links

Floyd Chiffer's Baseball Almanac Page
Floyd Chiffer's Baseball Library Page

1956 births
Living people
Baseball players from New York (state)
Major League Baseball pitchers
San Diego Padres players
Richmond Braves players
Hawaii Islanders players
UCLA Bruins baseball players
Sportspeople from Glen Cove, New York
Amarillo Gold Sox players
Indianapolis Indians players
Las Vegas Stars (baseball) players
Reno Silver Sox players
Toledo Mud Hens players
Mat-Su Miners players